The Queer Insurrection and Liberation Army (TQILA) was a queer anarchist armed group and subunit of the International Revolutionary People's Guerrilla Forces formed on 24 July 2017 by LGBT members of the IRPGF. Its formation was announced from Raqqa City along with a statement explaining the purposes of its formation; the systematic persecution of LGBT people by ISIL was highlighted as a significant motivation for the creation of the group. TQILA is reported to be the first LGBT unit to fight against the Islamic State of Iraq and the Levant, and apparently the first LGBT militia in the Middle East.

Formation 
The testimonial image of its formation, in which fighters posed alongside a sign with the motto "These faggots kill fascists" and two flags—the flag of the group and an LGBT flag—went viral. Western media reported on the unit extensively.

The unit, like the rest of the IRPGF, is a member of the International Freedom Battalion. One of the group's testimonial photos features Heval Mahir, commander of the International Freedom Battalion, and the Marxist-Leninist guerrilla groups, TKP/ML TİKKO, holding the LGBT flag.

Despite being part of the International Freedom Battalion some news outlets erroneously reported that TQILA was an official unit of the Syrian Democratic Forces which caused confusion. In response, Mustafa Bali, media director of the SDF, denied these claims. He stated that there is no LGBT brigade within the coalition. However, he did not deny the existence of an LGBT brigade within the International Freedom Battalion.

See also 

 Queer anarchism
 International Freedom Battalion
 International Revolutionary People's Guerrilla Forces
 Revolutionary Union for Internationalist Solidarity

Notes

References

External links
TQILA, un mal trago para la homofobia (in Spanish) "TQILA, a bad drink to homophobia" by HuffPost.
Not One Step Back: TQILA-IRPGF Speaks from Rojava, an article from the antifascist collective It's Going Down

Anarchism in Syria
Anti-ISIL factions in Syria
Defunct anarchist militant groups
Expatriate units and formations in the Syrian civil war
Far-left politics
Guerrilla organizations
International Freedom Battalion
International LGBT organizations
LGBT organizations in Syria
LGBT anarchism
Resistance movements
LGBT military or paramilitary units